"A Letter to You" is a song written by Dennis Linde and originally recorded by Shakin' Stevens. His version of the song went to #10 on the UK Singles Chart.

Five years later, the song was covered by Eddy Raven under the title "In a Letter to You". His first release for Capitol Records, it was Raven's fifth number one on the country chart, staying at number one for one week and spending fourteen weeks in the Top 40.

Chart performance

Shakin' Stevens

Eddy Raven 
Weekly charts

Year-end charts

References

Songs about letters (message)
1984 singles
1989 singles
Shakin' Stevens songs
Eddy Raven songs
Songs written by Dennis Linde
Song recordings produced by Barry Beckett
1984 songs
Universal Records (1988) singles
Epic Records singles